The Garabit viaduct is a railway arch bridge spanning the Truyère, near Ruynes-en-Margeride, Cantal, France, in the mountainous Massif Central region.

The bridge was constructed between 1882 and 1884 by Gustave Eiffel, with structural engineering by Maurice Koechlin, and was opened in 1885.

Background
By the late 1870s, Eiffel & Cie, the company founded by Eiffel in partnership with Théophile Seyrig, had established a place among the leading French engineering companies. Between 1875 and 1877, the company had built the Maria Pia Bridge over the Douro at Porto, and when the construction of a railway between Marvejols and Neussargues, both in Cantal, was proposed, the work of constructing a viaduct to cross the Truyère was given to Eiffel without the usual process of competitive tendering. That was at the recommendation of the state engineers since the technical problems involved were similar to those of the Maria Pia Bridge. Indeed, it was Eiffel & Cie's success with that project that had led to the proposal for a viaduct at Garabit.

Design and construction

The overall project cost was 3,100,000 francs.

Until 11 September 2009, one regular passenger train each way passed daily over the viaduct: a Corail route from Clermont-Ferrand to Béziers. On that date, the viaduct closed after cracks were discovered in one of the foundation piles. After a safety inspection, the Garabit viaduct reopened the following month, with a speed limit of 10 km/h (6 mph) for all traffic.

The design uses a parabolic arch.

In popular culture
In 1976, it was used to represent the condemned "Cassandra Crossing" bridge in the film The Cassandra Crossing. In the film, the bridge is depicted as being unused and derelict for 30 or 40 years and is considered dangerous, to the extent that people living nearby moved away fearing it could collapse.

See also
 List of bridges in France

References

External links 

 
Garabit Viaduct on bridge-info.org
PBS Building Big series databank entry for Garabit Viaduct

Railway bridges in France
Viaducts in France
Truss arch bridges
Bridges completed in 1885
Buildings and structures in Cantal
Gustave Eiffel's designs